Basilius Petritz (20 May 16476 September 1715) was a German composer and Kreuzkantor in Dresden from 1694 to 1713.

Petritz was born in Großenhain.  He succeeded the Thomaskantor Johann Schelle in Eilenburg, where he influenced the young Friedrich Zachow, until his bid for the Kreuzkantorat in 1694.  He died in Dresden, aged 68.

Works, editions and recordings
Die Herrlichkeit des Herrn - recording on collection by Sächsisches Vocalensemble, Batzdorfer Hofkapelle, directed Matthias Jung CPO 2009.

References

German Baroque composers
German male classical composers
18th-century classical composers
18th-century German composers
18th-century German male musicians
1647 births
1715 deaths